The Custom Flight North Star is a Canadian amateur-built aircraft, designed by Morgan Williams and produced by Custom Flight of Tiny, Ontario. The aircraft is based on the Piper PA-18 Super Cub and is supplied as a kit for amateur construction.

Design and development

The aircraft fuselage is made from welded 4130 steel tubing, with the wing constructed from aluminum sheet and all surfaces covered in doped aircraft fabric. The wing is supported by "V"-struts and jury struts. Construction time from the supplied kit is 1200 hours. The aircraft can be mounted on wheels, floats or skis.

Operational history
By December 2011 the company indicated that 20 examples had been completed and flown. By December 2015, 10 examples had been registered with Transport Canada and 13 in the United States with the Federal Aviation Administration.

Specifications (North Star)

References

External links

Homebuilt aircraft
Single-engined tractor aircraft
Custom Flight aircraft